Emine is an Arabic-origin given name used for females in Turkey. It has three major meanings: (1) one in whom you can trust and believe, (2) one who is benign and innocuous, and (3) one who is fearless and courageous. It is also argued that the word means beautiful. The name is also used in Japanese (えみね), often with the kanji 笑音 meaning "smiling sound."

Origins and variants
The origin of Emine is Arabic, but its source word has not been clearly established, and two accounts are given. It may be either the feminine form of Emin or a derivative of the African, Arabic, English, and Swahili name  Amina. Emmie is considered to be the Western version of the name.

The name of a sixth-century Leinster-based Irish cleric was Émíne. Emine was also the given name of the Roman emperor's daughter who was the lover of the Sultan of Babylon. The name was one of the 16th century Ottoman feminine names recorded in Istanbul.

Given name
People with that name include:
 Emine Ayna (born 1968), Turkish politician
 Emine Bilgin (born 1984), Turkish weightlifter
 Emine Bozkurt (born 1967), Dutch politician of Turkish descent
 Emine Çaykara (born 1964), Turkish historian and writer
 Emine Demir (born 1993), Turkish footballer
 Emine Ecem Esen (born 1994), Turkish footballer
 Emine Erdoğan (born 1955), wife of Turkish Prime Minister Recep Tayyip Erdoğan
 Emînê Evdal (1906–1964), Kurdish male writer, linguist and poet
 Emine Gümüş (born 1992), Turkish footballer
 Emine Hatun (died 1449), wife of Ottoman Sultan Mehmed I
 Emina Ilhamy (1858–1931), Egyptian royal
 Emine Işınsu (1938–2021), Turkish writer
 Emine Mihrişah Sultan (ca. ? – 1732), French-born second concubine of Ottoman Sultan Ahmed III, and the mother of Mustafa III
 Emine Nazikeda (1866–1941), principal consort of Sultan Mehmet VI, the last Ottoman sultan
 Emine Semiye Önasya (1864-1944), Turkish writer
 Emine Sevgi Özdamar (born 1946), Turkish-German actress, director and author.
 Emine Ülker Tarhan (born 1963), Turkish jurist and politician

Middle name
 Suzan Emine Kaube (born 1942), Turkish-German writer, painter and pedagogue

Other usages
The word Emine has also been used for geographical areas and places. A headland at the Bulgarian Black Sea coast is called Cape Emine. In addition, there is Emine Mountain or Emine Dagh in Stara planina in Bulgaria. The other related geographical term is Emine Balkan, which was used by the Bulgarians instead of Rumeli (Roman country) to refer to the territory of Bulgaria where some Turkish tribes had lived since the 11th century. Here, the word is derived not from Arabic, but from Greek (Haemus: Αἵμον [acc.]), where it is, in turn, a derivative of *Ἔμμωνα, Emona, discovered in documents of the early 14th century. However, Maria Todorova claims that Emine Balkan is the literal Ottoman translation of "Haemus mountain" and that the term was also employed by the Ottomans who derived the word Emine from the Byzantine words "Aimos", "Emmon", and "Emmona". In Ijevan, Armenia, a quarters is called Emine kışlağı.

In the 16th century Ottoman Empire, emine was the term used for export tax.

References

Arabic words and phrases
Irish words and phrases
Turkish feminine given names